Belles on Their Toes is a 1952 American family comedy film based on the autobiographical book Belles on Their Toes (1950) by siblings Frank Bunker Gilbreth Jr. and Ernestine Gilbreth Carey. The film, which debuted in New York City on May 2, 1952, was directed by Henry Levin, and Henry Ephron and Phoebe Ephron wrote the screenplay. It is a sequel to the film Cheaper by the Dozen (1950), based on Gilbreth and Carey's eponymous 1948 book.

Synopsis
Belles on Their Toes recounts the story of the Gilbreth family after the death of efficiency expert Frank Gilbreth Sr., husband of Dr. Lillian Gilbreth and father to twelve children. It tells of Lillian Gilbreth's lecture work, and her finding romance while caring for her growing children.

Cast
 Myrna Loy as Dr. Lillian M. Gilbreth 
 Jeanne Crain as Anne Gilbreth 
 Barbara Bates as Ernestine Gilbreth 
 Debra Paget as Martha Gilbreth 
 Robert Arthur as Frank Gilbreth 
 Carol Nugent as Lillie Gilbreth 
 Tommy Ivo as William Gilbreth 
 Jimmy Hunt as Fred Gilbreth 
 Anthony Sydes as Dan Gilbreth
 Teddy Driver as Jack Gilbreth 
 Tina Thompson as Jane Gilbreth
 Jeffrey Hunter as Dr. Bob Grayson 
 Edward Arnold as Sam Harper 
 Hoagy Carmichael as Thomas George Bracken 
 Martin Milner as Al Lynch 
 Verna Felton as Cousin Leora

Comparison to real life
This film is more true to the story than is the first film, Cheaper by the Dozen (1950).  Only the 11 living children are featured, and Jane is accurately portrayed as the youngest after Robert. However, the real surname of Anne's future husband was Robert Barney, which is changed to Grayson in the film.

References

External links
  
 
 
 
 

1952 films
20th Century Fox films
American comedy-drama films
American sequel films
1950s English-language films
Films about families
Films based on autobiographies
Films directed by Henry Levin
Films scored by Cyril J. Mockridge
Films set in the 1920s
Films set in New Jersey
1952 comedy-drama films
American children's comedy films
1950s American films